Fairview is the name of some places in the U.S. state of New Jersey:

 Fairview, Bergen County, New Jersey
 Fairview, Delran, New Jersey in Burlington County
 Fairview, Medford, New Jersey in Burlington County
 Fairview, Camden, Camden County, New Jersey
 Fairview, Gloucester County, New Jersey
 Fairview, Monmouth County, New Jersey

See also 
 Fairview (disambiguation)

New Jersey township disambiguation pages